"Reiko" (レイコ) is the third single by Carlos Toshiki & Omega Tribe featuring American singer Joey McCoy. The single was released on November 10, 1988 by VAP and charted at No. 15 on the Oricon charts.

Background 
In 1987, guitarist Mitsuya Kurokawa left the band 1986 Omega Tribe due to health issues, leaving vocalist Carlos Toshiki, guitarist Shinji Takashima, and keyboardist Toshitsugu Nishihara as the remaining members of the band. In 1988, they changed their name to Carlos Toshiki & Omega Tribe and released their first album Down Town Mystery. Joey McCoy, an American, was brought in as a backing vocalist for the album. With the absence of Kurokawa, McCoy joined the band in 1988 with the release of "Reiko," serving as the lead vocalist of the song. The song was arranged by Hiroshi Shinkawa and Jerry Hey. The B-side, "Wind Cage," was sung by Toshiki.

An English-translated version was also released, translated by Michael McFadden.

For the first time, a photo of all the members of the group was used for the jacket, the only other time being for their third album, Bad Girl.

Track listing

Charts

References 

Omega Tribe (Japanese band) songs
1988 singles